Jaroslav Róna (born 27 April 1957 in Prague-Letná) is a Czech-Jewish sculptor, painter, actor, educator, and writer.

Works
Franz Kafka - bronze statue on Dušní Street (Holy Spirit Street), historic Jewish Quarter, Prague; inspired by the events in the Description of a Struggle
The Angel Award statuette (an angel playing horn) 
The Komerční banka Award statuette
Book, Umanuté kresby, Praha: Torst, 2002,

Gallery

References

External links
 Videoreport with Jaroslav Róna on Artycok.TV
 Artist Jaroslav Róna ARTLIST-  database of contemporary Czech art

1957 births
Living people
20th-century sculptors
21st-century Czech sculptors
Czech male sculptors
20th-century Czech painters
Czech male painters
21st-century Czech painters
21st-century male artists
Czech male actors
20th-century Czech male artists
Czech Jews
Artists from Prague